Liu Jiali (born 6 April 1994) is a Chinese professional racing cyclist, who currently rides for UCI Women's Continental Team .

References

External links

1994 births
Living people
Chinese female cyclists
Place of birth missing (living people)
Asian Games medalists in cycling
Asian Games silver medalists for China
Asian Games bronze medalists for China
Cyclists at the 2018 Asian Games
Medalists at the 2018 Asian Games
Cyclists at the 2020 Summer Olympics
Olympic cyclists of China
21st-century Chinese women